George Warren Rickey (June 6, 1907 – July 17, 2002) was an American kinetic sculptor.

Early life and education
Rickey was born on June 6, 1907, in South Bend, Indiana. When Rickey was still a child, his father, an executive with Singer Sewing Machine Company, moved the family to Glasgow, Scotland, in 1913. They lived near the river Clyde, and George learned to sail around the outer islands on the family's  sailboat.

Rickey was educated at Glenalmond College and received a degree in History from Balliol College, Oxford, with frequent visits to the Ruskin School of Drawing.  He spent a short time traveling Europe and, against the advice of his father, studied art in Paris at Académie L'Hote and Académie Moderne. He then returned to the United States and began teaching at the Groton School, where among his many students was future National Security Advisor McGeorge Bundy.

After leaving Groton, Rickey worked at various schools throughout the country as part of the Carnegie Corporation Visiting Artists/Artists in Residence program (partially funded by the Works Progress Administration). His focus was primarily on painting. While taking part in these programs, he painted portraits, taught classes, and created a set of murals at Knox College, Galesburg, Illinois. He maintained an art studio in New York from 1934 to 1942, when he was drafted.

Rickey's interest in things mechanical re-awakened during his wartime work in aircraft and gunnery systems research and maintenance. Following his discharge, he studied art at the New York University Institute of Fine Arts and later at the Chicago Institute of Design, funded by the G.I. Bill. He taught art at variety of colleges, including Muhlenberg College.  While at Muhlenberg, he was commissioned by J. I. Rodale to illustrate an edition of Anton Chekhov's The Beggar and Other Tales. Rickey later moved on to Indiana University South Bend. There, he encountered and was inspired by the work of David Smith.

Kinetic sculpture
Rickey turned from painting to creating kinetic sculpture. Rickey combined his love of engineering and mechanics by designing sculptures whose metal parts moved in response to the slightest air currents.

His first sculpture was shown in New York in 1951 at the Metropolitan Museum of Art group show American Sculpture 1951. The Museum of Modern Art, in New York purchased his Two Lines Temporal I, after Alfred Barr,  MOMA's then Director,  had seen it at the exhibition Documenta III in Kassel, Germany.

Rickey's sculptures can now be seen in major museums in the US and in most European capitals, Japan, and New Zealand. His work is often compared to the mobiles of Alexander Calder, but while Calder used organic, playful forms, Rickey's European lineage is more closely related to the Constructivist principles of geometric engineering. In 1967, he wrote Constructivism – origins and evolution,  published by George Braziller,  Inc., New York.

In works such as Two Open Triangles Up Gyratory, Rickey's two wind driven elements (engineered to withstand winds of ) provide an endless series of combined, almost dance like, shapes and movements.

Rickey mastered not only ordered predictable movements, but also mastered methods of controlling both the speed and tempo of similar objects to respond more randomly, such as in his work Four Open Rectangles Diagonal Jointed Gyratory V.

Much of his work was created in his studio in East Chatham, New York, where he moved after taking a position as a professor of art (sculpture) at Rensselaer Polytechnic Institute in Troy, New York. His kinetic sculpture titled Two Rectangles, Vertical Gyratory Up, Variation III was a central element of the Rensselaer campus from 1972. It is now located in Zurich, Switzerland, at the headquarters of UBS. This sculpture was known as the Crinatoid when it was located on the Rensselaer campus on long term loan. It was removed after Rickey and Rensselaer could not agree on a purchase price.

Rickey also lived and worked in Berlin for many years, following the Documenta III art show. His studio time was spent constructing sculpture and preparing for exhibitions in Europe. In Rickey's words the city was like a "cocoon" in the middle of communist East Germany, with a lively and advanced social and cultural life which he partook in fully. During this time he received numerous Honorary Doctor of Fine Arts degrees.

In 1979 he had a retrospective at the Guggenheim Museum in New York City. Rickey's sculptures are on permanent exhibition at the National Gallery of Art, and the Hirshhorn Museum in Washington, D.C., the Governor Nelson A. Rockefeller Empire State Plaza Art Collection in Albany, New York, the San Diego Museum of Art, The Delaware Art Museum, The Indiana University Art Museum, the Honolulu Museum of Art, Frederik Meijer Gardens & Sculpture Park, and at the Laumeier Sculpture Park in St. Louis, The Hyde Collection in Glens Falls, NY, and many other institutions.

In 1985, George Rickey had a major retrospective in South Bend, Indiana, the place of his birth. His sculptures were installed outside (and inside) of the South Bend Art Center, and also at the Snite Museum of Art on the campus of the University of Notre Dame. Rickey gave a presentation of his work at the Snite. One of the stories he told concerned how, as a result of a World War II-era, government-administered aptitude test, he was assigned to design machine gun turrets for bombers. It was in this job that he became familiar with the high-quality ball bearings, balancing weights, riveted sheet metal, lightweight aircraft construction techniques, and modern hardware (and the vendors for same) that were to become the mechanical foundation for his later forays into lightweight, delicately balanced, wind-activated kinetic sculpture.

Rickey died at his home in Saint Paul, Minnesota, on July 17, 2002, at the age of 95. The Rickey Estate is currently represented by Kasmin Gallery in New York City. The Rickey archive will have a permanent home at Notre Dame.

Gallery

Honors and awards
 (1999) Lifetime Achievement in Contemporary Sculpture Award, International Sculpture Center.

See also

 Double L Excentric Gyratory
Indianapolis Art Center which hosted the retrospective show A Life in Art: Works by George Rickey
 Two Lines Up Excentric Variation VI (1977), Columbus, Ohio

References

 Honolulu Museum of Art, Spalding House Self-guided Tour, Sculpture Garden, 2014, p. 13
 Kvaran, Einar Einarsson, An Annotated Inventory of Outdoor Sculpture in Washtenaw County, Master's Degree Project, 1989.
 Lizzi, Maria.  Archivist, George Rickey Workshop, East Chatham, NY
 New Jersey State Museum, Sculptures by George Rickey and James Seawright, New Jersey State Museum, Trenton, 1970.
 Popper, Frank, Origins and Development of Kinetic Art, Studio Vista and New York Graphic Society, 1968.
 Thalacker, Donald, The Place of Art In the World of Architecture, Chelsea House Publishers, New York, 1980, pp. 61–63.

External links

 The George Rickey Foundation
 George Rickey on artnet Monographs
 Art Cyclopedia article
 Cluster of Four Cubes at National Gallery of Art Sculpture Garden - video 5' 6"
 Biography and available works Galerie Ludorff, Düsseldorf, Germany
"In Search of the Chrinitoid", an article about Rickey's work at RPI.
 
 Photos of George Rickey Sculptures 
George Rickey in the National Gallery of Australia Kenneth Tyler Collection

1907 births
2002 deaths
Modern sculptors
American abstract artists
20th-century American sculptors
20th-century American male artists
American male sculptors
Rensselaer Polytechnic Institute faculty
Muhlenberg College faculty
Works Progress Administration workers
People of the New Deal arts projects
People educated at Glenalmond College
New York University Institute of Fine Arts alumni
Kinetic art